is a Japanese manga series written and illustrated by Akira Himekawa, and is based on the video game of the same name. It was serialized through Shogakukan's MangaONE app from February 2016–January 2022, and spans 70 chapters across 11 volumes.

Development
After completing manga adaptations of other games from The Legend of Zelda series, the duo Akira Himekawa wanted to adapt The Legend of Zelda: Twilight Princess, however, since the game was rated more mature than other games in The Legend of Zelda series, they wanted a weekly magazine to serialize in with a higher-aged target demographic. However, they were unable to find a suitable magazine. After requests from fans, the duo later decided to approach Nintendo again on the hopes of being able to find a magazine, and eventually settled on MangaONE. Due to this new agreement, they were able to make the adaptation longer than previous adaptations, which only lasted for one or two tankōbon volumes.

Publication
In July 2015, the duo Akira Himekawa announced they were working on a new manga adaptation for The Legend of Zelda series. In February 2016, the duo announced the game they would be adapting was The Legend of Zelda: Twilight Princess, and it would start serialization on the MangaONE app and website on February 8, 2016. From November 2017 to February 2018, Himekawa put the series on hiatus in order to "recharge". In May 2020, Himekawa announced that the series had entered its final arc. The series entered its climax in the tenth volume, to be concluded in the eleventh. The final chapter was released on January 30, 2022, with the final volume released the following March.

An English release of the series was first hinted at in May 2016, when Himekawa made a post on their Facebook claiming that Viz Media would publish the series. Three months later at New York Comic Con, Viz Media confirmed they had licensed the series for English publication.

Volume list

Reception
Rebecca Silverman from Anime News Network praised the first volume for it being easy to pick up even for someone who hadn't played the game and the characterization of Link, while criticizing the art for being too dark at times.  Nick Smith from ICv2 concurred with Silverman, praising the plot as easy to pick up for anyone, while also praising the artwork. Evan Minato from Otaku USA praised the art and characters, while being critical of the plot, stating it is "too melodramatic". Matthew Warner from The Fandom Post concurred with  Silverman and Smith, praising the plot as easy to pick up for anyone and calling it "[overall] an enjoyable ride". Leroy Douresseaux from Comic Book Bin also offered praise for the plot, calling the volume "[a] good read". Demelza from Anime UK News also praised the first volume for both Himekawa's artwork and adaptation of the game's story.

In 2017, Amazon listed the series as one of their best books of 2017 in the comics and graphic novels category. Several of the volumes have ranked on The NPD Group's monthly BookScan's list of top adult graphic novels, such as the first volume ranking third on the 2017 list and the third and fourth volumes ranking third upon their release.

Notes

References

External links

Adventure anime and manga
Dark fantasy anime and manga
Japanese webcomics
Manga based on video games
Shogakukan manga
Shōnen manga
Viz Media manga
Webcomics in print
Works based on The Legend of Zelda